Dark Horse Comics is an American comic book company. These are the ongoing and current limited series publications it has released under its own brand.

Comics published through their various imprints appear on the List of Dark Horse Comics imprint publications, collected editions of its own publications appear on the List of Dark Horse Comics collected editions, and reprints appear on the List of Dark Horse Comics reprints.

0–9

A

B

C

D

E

F

G

H

I

J

K

L

M

N

O

P

Q

R

S

T

U

V

W

X

Y

Z

References

External links
 
 Dark Horse Comics at the Big Comic Book Database
 

Dark Horse Comics